The 77th annual Venice International Film Festival was held from 2 to 12 September 2020, albeit in a "more restrained format" due to the COVID-19 pandemic. Australian actress Cate Blanchett was appointed as the President of the Jury. The Ties, directed by Daniele Luchetti, was selected as the opening film, the first Italian film in 11 years to open the festival. The Golden Lion was awarded to Nomadland, directed by Chloé Zhao. The Grand Jury Prize was awarded to the Mexican-French art film thriller New Order. The Volpi Cup for Best Actor was won by Pierfrancesco Favino and the Volpi Cup for Best Actress was won by Vanessa Kirby. The Silver Lion for Best Direction was awarded to Kiyoshi Kurosawa for the movie Wife of a Spy.

Jury
Main Competition (Venezia 77)
 Cate Blanchett, Australian actress (Jury President)
 Matt Dillon, American actor
 Veronika Franz, Austrian director and screenwriter
 Joanna Hogg, British director and screenwriter
 Nicola Lagioia, Italian author
 Christian Petzold, German director and screenwriter
 Ludivine Sagnier, French actress and model

Horizons
 Claire Denis, French director and screenwriter (Jury President)
 Oskar Alegria, Spanish director
 Francesca Comencini, Italian director and screenwriter
 Katriel Schory, former Israel Film Fund topper
 Christine Vachon, American producer

Luigi De Laurentiis Award for a Debut Film
 Claudio Giovannesi, Italian director and screenwriter (Jury President)
 Rémi Bonhomme, Marrakech International Film Festival artistic director
 Dora Bouchoucha, Tunisian producer

Venice Virtual Reality
 Céline Tricart, American 3D and virtual reality expert
 Asif Kapadia, British director
 Hideo Kojima, Japanese video game author and pioneer

Official selection
The complete line-up of the Official selection was announced on 28 July 2020.

In Competition
The following films were selected for the main international competition:

Highlighted title indicates Golden Lion winner.

Out of Competition
The following films were selected to be screened out of competition:

Horizons
The following films were selected for the Horizons section:

Highlighted titles indicate Horizons Prizes for Best Feature Film and Best Short Film respectively.

Venice Classics
The following films were selected to be screened in the Venice Classics section, which this year is scheduled to be held at the Il Cinema Ritrovato Festival in Bologna, from 25 to 31 August:

Autonomous sections

International Critics' Week
The following films were selected for the 35th Venice International Critics' Week:

Giornate degli Autori
The following films were selected for the 17th edition of the Giornate degli Autori section:

Awards

Official selection
The following official awards were presented at the 77th edition:

In Competition
Golden Lion: Nomadland by Chloé Zhao
Grand Jury Prize: New Order by Michel Franco
Silver Lion: Kiyoshi Kurosawa for Wife of a Spy
Volpi Cup for Best Actress: Vanessa Kirby for Pieces of a Woman
Volpi Cup for Best Actor: Pierfrancesco Favino for Padrenostro
Golden Osella for Best Screenplay: Chaitanya Tamhane for The Disciple
Special Jury Prize: Dear Comrades! by Andrei Konchalovsky
Marcello Mastroianni Award: Rouhollah Zamani for Sun Children

Horizons (Orizzonti)
Best Film: The Wasteland, Ahmad Bahrami
Best Director: Lav Diaz, Lahi, Hayop (Genus Pan)
Special Jury Prize: Listen, Ana Rocha de Sousa
Best Actress: Khansa Batma, Zanka Contact
Best Actor: Yahya Mahayni, The Man Who Sold His Skin
Best Screenplay: I Predatori, Pietro Castellitto
Best Short Film: Entre tú y milagros, Mariana Saffon

Special Awards
Golden Lion For Lifetime Achievement: Ann Hui and Tilda Swinton

References

External links
 

77
2020 film festivals
2020 in Italian cinema
Film
Impact of the COVID-19 pandemic on cinema